Kai Daniel Brünker (born 10 June 1994) is a German professional footballer who plays for 1. FC Magdeburg, as a striker.

Early and personal life
Brünker is from Villingen-Schwenningen; in August 2018 he stated that a number of people from his village had bought Bradford City shirts and were watching matches online. During the 2020 coronavirus outbreak in Germany he returned to stay in Villingen after the football season had been ended early.

Career
Brünker spent his early career in Germany with FC Kappel, SV Zimmern, FC 08 Villingen and SC Freiburg II.

He turned professional with English club Bradford City in January 2018, signing an 18-month contract. He was signed by the club as support for Charlie Wyke. He made his debut for the club on 27 January 2018, appearing as a substitute in a 4–0 league defeat at home to AFC Wimbledon. On 12 April 2018, after Bradford's poor form, manager Simon Grayson suggested Brünker was close to making his first start for the club. He made his first start the next day, on 13 April 2018, in a 0–0 league draw at home to Shrewsbury Town. Later that month, he stated that he was becoming used to playing and living in England. Ahead of the 2018–19 season he stated he was looking forward to breaking back into the first team following an ankle injury at the end of the previous season and the appointment of Michael Collins as the new manager.

He scored his first goal for Bradford City in a 4–1 home defeat in the EFL Trophy on 9 October 2018. He described it as a "special moment".

He left the club in January 2019, to return to Germany, signing for SG Sonnenhof Großaspach on a contract until June 2020. After leaving Bradford City he was described by the local newspaper as "a bit of a cult hero at City, but sadly it was for all the wrong reasons".

At the end of the 2019–20 season, following Sonnenhof Großaspach's relegation, he signed for 1. FC Magdeburg on a two-year contract.

Career statistics

References

1994 births
Living people
People from Villingen-Schwenningen
Sportspeople from Freiburg (region)
German footballers
Association football forwards
FC 08 Villingen players
SC Freiburg II players
Bradford City A.F.C. players
SG Sonnenhof Großaspach players
1. FC Magdeburg players
3. Liga players
Regionalliga players
English Football League players
German expatriate footballers
German expatriate sportspeople in England
Expatriate footballers in England
Footballers from Baden-Württemberg